Viola hortensis or Viola tricolor var. hortensis may refer to:
Viola tricolor (synonyms: Viola tricolor var. hortensis DC., Viola hortensis (DC.) Rouy & Foucaud)
Viola × wittrockiana (synonyms: Viola hortensis hort. ex Steud., Viola hortensis Wettst., Viola tricolor var. hortensis Groenland & Rümpler)
Viola odorata (synonym: Viola hortensis Schur)